Moscow Bureau is a half-hour ABC television comedy made in 1985 as a pilot for a proposed series.  Written by Emmy Award winner  David Lloyd and directed by  John Rich, the show aired in the summer of the following year as an episode of "ABC Comedy Specials", listed in some markets as "Comedy Factory".<ref>New York Times, TV Weekend; "ABC COMEDY SPECIAL" offers "Hearts of Steel By John J. O'Connor, June 13, 1986.</ref>Television Series and Specials Scripts, 1946-1992: A Catalog of the American Radio Archives Collection, Compiled by Jeanette M Bernard and Klaudia England, Foreword by Norman Corwin , McFarland & Company, Incorporated Publishers Aug 11, 2009.Moscow Bureau takes place in what was still Cold War-era Moscow, focusing on the hard-drinking editor at a weekly U.S. newsmagazine and his staff of reporters who "skulk, double-deal, scoop each other, and take other alarming measures to get their stories out to the world."Chicago Tribune, MPBS Texas Documentary Series Too Starry-eyed For Its Own Good by Clifford Terry, June 6, 1986.

Cast:  Caroline McWilliams (Christine Nichols), William Windom (Herb Medlock), Elya Baskin (Sasha Zhukov), Barrie Ingham (Nigel Blake), Nancy Lane (Connie Uecker), Dennis Drake (Tim Carmichael), Michael Zaslow (Phil), James Newell (1st Reporter), Charles Knox Robinson (2nd Reporter'')

References

1986 American television episodes
Television pilots not picked up as a series